Trinity Academy (formerly Holy Trinity Church of England Senior School) is a church aided 11 to 18 co-educational academy school located in Halifax in the Anglican Diocese of Leeds, England.

The school was founded in 1815 by the then Vicar of Halifax. The school was situated at Savile Hall, the former home of Lord Savile, in the centre of Halifax and since has moved to Illingworth, in the north of Halifax, where it sits in the locality of other secondary schools, including North Halifax Grammar School and St Catherine's Catholic High School.

The school became a specialist Business and Enterprise College in 2005. In 2007, it also gained the Quality Standard for Careers Education and Guidance and the Healthy School's Award.

The Academy
In July 2010 Holy Trinity Senior School closed, and the school site became part of the Trinity Academy. Students at Holy Trinity were automatically entitled to a place at the new Academy. Trinity Academy can cater for 1700 male and female pupils, aged 11 – 16. The academy admit children of all, or no, faiths; however a proportion of places are reserved for children linked to local churches.

In 2012 Trinity Academy was judged to have made 'outstanding' progress since opening due to the rapid improvement in results compared to the predecessor school. In 2013 it was judged 'outstanding' in all areas by Ofsted. As at 2022 this is the school's most recent inspection.

References

External links
Trinity Academy Halifax

Academies in Calderdale
Schools in Halifax, West Yorkshire
Educational institutions established in 1815
1815 establishments in England
Church of England secondary schools in the Diocese of Leeds
Secondary schools in Calderdale
People educated at Trinity Academy, Halifax